Richard Bluff is an English visual effects supervisor. Known for his works in Disney's visual effects company Industrial Light & Magic (ILM) as a digital matte artist and visual effects supervisor in acclaimed films such as Star Wars: Episode III - Revenge of the Sith (2005),  The Island (2005), Transformers (2007-11), Indiana Jones and the Kingdom of the Crystal Skull (2008), Star Trek (2009), Avatar (2009), The Avengers (2012), Cloud Atlas (2012) Pacific Rim (2013), The Big Short (2015) and Doctor Strange (2016), for which he received an Academy Award for Best Visual Effects nomination at the 89th Academy Awards. He previously worked at Blur Studio as digital artist.

Awards and nomination
 Nominated: Academy Award for Best Visual Effects - Doctor Strange
 Nominated: BAFTA Award for Best Special Visual Effects - Doctor Strange
 Nominated: Satellite Award for Best Visual Effects - Doctor Strange
 Nominated: Visual Effects Society Award for Outstanding Visual Effects in an Effects Driven Feature Motion Picture - Doctor Strange

References

External links
 Richard Bluff at ILM
 

Living people
Industrial Light & Magic people
Special effects people
Primetime Emmy Award winners
Year of birth missing (living people)